Jonna Lee may refer to:

 Jonna Lee (actress) (born 1963), American television and film actress
 Jonna Lee (singer) (born 1981), Swedish singer-songwriter